This is a list of 212 species in the genus Dilophus.

Dilophus species

References

Dilophus